Sekers is a surname. Notable people with the surname include: 

 David Sekers (born 1943), British historian, son of Nicholas 
 Nicholas Sekers (1910–1972), British industrialist
 Sekers Building

See also
 Ekers
 Şeker